Bilaigarh is a Major town in the Sarangarh District of Chhattisgarh, India.

Geography
It is located at an elevation of 226 m above MSL.

Location
The National Highway 200 passes through Bilaigarh. The nearest airport is Raipur Airport and the nearest railway station is at Champa.

References

External links
 About Bilaigarh

Villages in Raipur district